Ippa or IPPA may refer to one of the following:

Ippa, a genus of insects
IPPA, four steps of physical examination in medicine
The International Pitch and Putt Association, the second-established of the two global governing bodies of pitch and putt
IPPA The Irish Professional Photographers Association
IPPA, International Positive Psychology Association, an association which promotes positive psychology